Merragata hebroides is a species of velvet water bug in the family Hebridae. It is found in the Caribbean Sea, Central America, North America, Oceania, and South America.

References

Further reading

 

Articles created by Qbugbot
Insects described in 1877
Hebroidea